Jeffrey Rose, CMH, is an American clinical hypnotist, nutritionist, lecturer, sleep specialist, addiction recovery coach, cable TV show host, lecturer, Rockland County chapter leader of Start School Later sleep specialist and writer. 

Rose is the founder and Director of the Advanced Hypnosis Center, which he established in New York City in 1999 and the Advanced Hypnosis Center in Rockland County, N.Y., in 2005.

Rose was a staff writer at RECOVER Magazine, where he regularly contributed articles on health and wellness. As the host of “Holistic Healing” he covered the 2015 Integrative Healthcare Symposium where he interviewed Dr. James Gordon, Dr. Kenneth Bock and Hyla Cass, MD, the 2016 Integrative Healthcare Symposium where he interviewed Dr. David Perlmutter and Dr. Mark Hyman, and the 2017 Integrative Healthcare Symposium where he interviewed Dr. David Katz. He also regularly appears as a frequent guest talking about hypnosis on Manhattan Neighborhood Network cable television.

Rose is a colleague of Elena Beloff. At his suggestion, Beloff was cast as the hypnotist at the center of Philippe Parreno's multimedia art extravaganza "H{N0YPN(Y}OSIS".

Education
Rose received his bachelor's degree from New York University. He is certified by the International Medical Dental Hypnosis Association (IMDHA), National Guild of Hypnotists, and the International Association of Counselors and Therapists. He has received continued education at Integrative Healthcare Symposium.

Lecture
Rose is a popular lecturer to the public. He has taught the course, “An Holistic Approach to a Hypnosis Practice” at the International Association of Counselors and Therapists annual conference and has taught courses on hypnosis and sleep at the New York Open Center.

Community activism
Rose is the founder and leader of Start School Later, Rockland County, advocating for high school start times opening later in the morning so that teenagers can the get sufficient sleep they need to be healthy, fully enjoy life, excel in school and achieve their full potential. Rose was the former leader of the Weston A. Price Foundation Rockland County Chapter, dedicated to restoring nutrient-dense foods to the human diet through education, research and activism. He advises the New York Coalition for Healthy School Food and supports the Campaign for a Commercial-Free Childhood.  He is a member of the Rockland County School Health and Wellness Coalition. The New York Public Interest Research Group (NYPIRG) presented Rose with an award for his years of dedicated service in the public interest.

Television appearances

Rose, who treats sleep problems in adolescents and adults, leads the Rockland County, N.Y., chapter of the national organization Start School Later. Rose is a highly sought out practitioner for the medical and dental applications of hypnosis in New York as well as Rose has appeared and been featured in stories on hypnosis on:

WPIX New York's “Dr. Steve Show”

CBS' “The Early Show”

CNN American Morning news segment “Kick the Butt”

The Tyra Banks Show

CBS News New York's "The Hypnosis Fix”

“Sleep Week" WNYC National Public Radio's The Take Away story "Can Hypnosis Help a Resolution's Resolve”

Arise TV's Entertainment 360 

Al Jazeera English "Quitting Smoking, Harder for Women?”

Veria Living's Got Zen? Episode "Using Zen to Battle Your Fears“

Yahoo Screen's Mansome Hypnotism Episode "You are getting very sleepy, "Fox & Friends”

PIX11 News’ "Allow Hypnotist to Help You Achieve Your New Year's Resolution”

PIX11 News’ "How Hypnosis Can Help Students Develop Better Sleep Patterns”

Rose interviewed Dr. James Samuel Gordon, the world-renowned expert in using mind-body medicine

Dr. Mark Hyman (doctor) and David Perlmutter on his Holistic Healing cable show

On April 21, 2016,  Rose appeared as an expert on New York City's PIX11 News to discuss how political candidates use hypnosis techniques to sway voters.

Radio interviews
Rose was the guest on Dr. Ronald Hoffman's Intelligent Medicine Podcast on April 9, 2015 on the "Hypnosis as a tool for overcoming bad habits" episode.

Seth Rudetsky on his Sirius Radio program "Seth Speaks" about hypnosis for stage fright.

Dr. Harry Fisch on his  "Man Up" radio show about sleep and hypnosis.

Published articles
Since 2003, Rose has published many articles for health related publications in his areas of expertise.

"Nutrition 101: Carbohydrates" from RECOVER Magazine ine by Jeffrey Rose, Clinical Hypnotist and Nutritionist

“Dealing with Stress” from RECOVER Magazine May 2005 by Jeffrey Rose, Clinical Hypnotist

“Sugar and Health” From RECOVER Magazine March 2005 by Jeffrey Rose, New York Hypnotist & Nutritionist

“Smoking and Addiction” From RECOVER Magazine January 2005 by Jeffrey Rose, Clinical Hypnotist 

“Exercise and Recovery” From RECOVER Magazine May 2004 by Jeffrey Rose, Clinical Hypnotist and Nutritionist

“Easing Recovery with Omega-3 Fatty Acid Supplementation” from RECOVER Magazine March 2004 by Jeffrey Rose, Clinical Hypnotist and Nutritionist

“Sleep Hygiene for Health” RECOVER Magazine December 2004 by Jeffrey Rose, Clinical Hypnotist

“Caffeine, Health and Recovery” from RECOVER  Magazine July 2004 by Jeffrey Rose, Clinical Hypnotist and Nutritionist

“Hypnotherapy: Tap Your Subconscious” from RECOVER Magazine November 2003 by Jeffrey Rose, CMH

“HYPNOTHERAPY FOR YOUR PATIENTS” from PCI JOURNAL Volume 11 November 4, 2003

Rose has appeared or been featured on WPIX New York's “Dr. Steve Show,”  CBS’ “The Early Show”,  CNN American Morning news segment “Kick the Butt,” the “Tyra Banks Show” and Arise TV's Entertainment 360.

Magazine articles
Rose was featured in BEST LIFE Magazine “I Got Hypnotized to Have Better Sex,” AVANT GARDE Magazine and New City Neighbors. He has been featured in or has been quoted in Martha Stewart Living's article on fear of flying, “Mind Over Matter”, Well and Good NYC's “Seeking Holistic Methods to Quit Smoking.” Men's Vogue, Exhale/Inhale Magazine, “NYC & Hampton’s Guide to Fitness, Beauty and Wellness,” Palm Beach Society and New York's Promenade Magazine.

Jeffrey Rose was featured in Martha Stewart Living's article on fear of flying, “Mind Over Matter,” Well and Good NYC's “Seeking Holistic Methods to Quit Smoking.” Men's Vogue, Exhale/Inhale Magazine, “NYC & Hampton’s Guide to Fitness, Beauty and Wellness,” Palm Beach Society and New York's Promenade Magazine. Rose was also featured in The Observer's article "Countdown to Bliss."

References

External links
 
 Advanced Hypnosis Center of Rockland County

American hypnotists
American nutritionists
Sleep researchers
American motivational speakers
Year of birth missing (living people)
Living people
New York University alumni